Freestyle skiing at the 1996 Asian Winter Games took place in the city of Harbin, China with two events contested - one each for men and women. Freestyle skiing was introduced in this edition of the Winter Asiad.

Medalists

Medal table

References

External links
FIS official website

 
1996 Asian Winter Games events
1996
Asian Winter Games